Barberino Tavarnelle is a comune (municipality) in the Metropolitan City of Florence in the Italian region Tuscany, located about  south of Florence.

History
Barberino Tavarnelle was created on 1 January 2019 by merger of municipalities of Barberino Val d'Elsa and Tavarnelle Val di Pesa.

Frazioni 

Badia a Passignano, Barberino Val d'Elsa, Bonazza, Casanuova del Piano, Chiostrini, Cipressino, Linari, Madonna di Pietracupa, Magliano, Marcialla (partially), Monsanto, Morrocco, Noce, Palazzuolo, Pastine, Petrognano, Pontenuovo, Ponzano, Romita, Sambuca Val di Pesa, San Donato in Poggio, San Filippo a Ponzano, San Martino, San Michele, San Pietro in Bossolo, Sant'Appiano, Sosta del Papa, Spoiano, Tavarnelle Val di Pesa, Tignano, Vico d'Elsa, Vigliano, Zambra

Twin towns – sister cities

Barberino Tavarnelle is twinned with:

 Béboto, Chad
 Bodo, Chad
 Edchera, Western Sahara
 Fălticeni, Romania
 Gagny, France
 Hatvan, Hungary

 Schliersee, Germany
 Tangermünde, Germany

References

External links
Official website